Clinton Bristow Jr. (1949 – August 19, 2006) was an American lawyer, academic official, and who served as the president of the Chicago Board of Education and as the sixteenth president of Alcorn State University.

Early life and education
Bristow was born in 1949 in Montgomery, Alabama

Bristow graduated from East Tech high school in 1967 as class valedictorian. At East Tech he had served as class president, and been a letterman in football.

Bristow graduated from Northwestern University in 1971 with a Bachelor of Arts. In 1974, he received his juris doctor from Northwestern, and in 1977 he received a Ph.D. in education administration and public administration from Northwestern. In 1984, he received his MBA from Governors State University.

Career
In October 1990, the Chicago Board of Education elected Bristow as its president. He served until 1992.

A native of Alabama, Bristow was installed as Alcorn's president on August 24, 1995. Under his leadership, the number of students in Alcorn's graduate and professional programs grew by a large percentage. An increase in the number of international students attending Alcorn during Bristow's administration gained national attention. Bristow also served as president of the Southwestern Athletic Conference.

Bristow died of heart failure on August 19, 2006, just two days before the start of Alcorn's fall 2006 semester. He was known to be an avid runner, and was found dead on the campus track.  He was 57.

References

External links
Alcorn State University biography of Bristow
Alcorn's president dies on campus (from the Clarion-Ledger, August 20, 2006)

1949 births
2006 deaths
Northwestern University alumni
Northwestern University Pritzker School of Law alumni
Alcorn State University faculty
Alabama lawyers
Governors State University alumni
Heads of universities and colleges in the United States
20th-century American lawyers
African-American lawyers
Presidents of the Chicago Board of Education
20th-century African-American people
21st-century African-American people
20th-century American academics